The Islamic Sacred Relics, also known as the Holy Relics, known collectively as the Sacred Trust, consist of religious relics sent to the Ottoman Sultans between the 16th century to the late 19th century.

With the conquest of the Arabic world by Sultan Selim I (1517), the Caliphate passed from the vanquished Abbasids to the Ottoman sultans. The Islamic prophet Muhammad’s mantle, which was kept by the last Abbasid Caliph Mutawakkil III, was given to Selim I.

The various relics of Muhammad, his followers, and other items purportedly associated with Muhammad were brought to Topkapı Palace in Istanbul, where they remain to this day.

The relics are housed in the former private chambers of the sultan, the Privy Chambers, which are located in the Third Courtyard of the palace.

 The Destimal Chamber is the room in which Abraham's Pot, Joseph's Turban, Moses's Staff, David's Sword, scrolls belonging to John the Baptist, and Muhammad's footprint are on display.
 The Şadırvanlı Sofa is the room where the keys to the Kaaba, the gutters of the Kaaba, the casing of the Black Stone, the Door of Repentance, and the swords of Muhammad's companions are on display.
 The Audience Chamber, also known as the House of Petitions houses a piece from a tooth of Muhammad, hair from the beard of Muhammad, the Seal of Muhammad, an autographed Letter of Muhammad, and Muhammad's swords and bow in their exclusive reliquary made by Ottoman goldsmiths. These are known as the Sacred Trusts. The Qur'an is recited continuously by a mufti in this chamber.
 The Chamber of the Blessed Mantle houses the latticed silver canopy under which the Blessed Mantle and the Holy Banner of Muhammad are kept in their golden chests.

Blessed Mantle 

The Blessed Mantle, also known as the Holy Mantle, according to tradition was given by Muhammad to the poet Ka'b bin Zuhayr. The poet's poem Kasida-ı Burda, praising Muhammad, decorates the Room of the Blessed Mantle. The mantle is almost two yards long and made of black wool lined with a cream-colored fabric.

Traditionally the mantle was visited by the sultan, his family, and the court during a ceremony on the fifteenth day of Ramadan each year. During the ceremony the mantle was kissed. This was not done directly, but a piece of muslin was placed over the vestment. This decorated kerchief, called the Noble Kerchief (destimal-ı şerif), was provided to each person by the Agha of the Muslin (Tülbent Ağası).

The mantle was kept in a golden box, to which only the sultan had the keys. The box was opened while he intoned the Basmala. The mantle was actually wrapped in a number of square pieces of cloth called bohças. In it was another small golden box in which forty bohças were wrapped around the mantle itself. The number forty was considered especially auspicious.

The Agha of the Muslin placed the first kerchief on the mantle and the sultan kissed it, followed by the imperial princes, viziers, officials, male attendants, and eunuchs. This was done while Qur'anic chants filled the chamber.

Then followed the women, who were led by the Queen Mother, followed by the chief consorts, concubines, and daughters of the sultan, as well as the wives of all officials present and female attendants. Princess Imperial Hamide Ayşe Sultan, daughter of Sultan Abdul Hamid II, gave a rare eyewitness account in her book “Babam Abdülhamit” (My Father, Abdülhamit), Istanbul, 1960. This passage by Ayşe Sultan provides an intimate glimpse of Abdülhamit II and her life as his daughter:

A button of the mantle was dipped in rose water. Drops of the rose water were poured into pitchers which in turn were given to important people. This water was called the Water of the Blessed Mantle (Hırka-ı Saadet Suyu) and was purported to have miraculous qualities. After the ceremony, the sultan had the mantle packed back into its forty bohças, the small golden box, the other bohças and then into the large golden box which itself was placed under the silver latticed canopy until next year.

Holy Banner 

The second most important relic is the Holy Banner, also known as the Sacred Standard of Muhammad (literally the "Noble Banner"). It is said to be the banner of Muhammad himself or at least to originate from his era. The origins of the Ottoman's acquisition of the relic is disputed. The banner was first used in a battle against the Austrian Habsburgs in 1593 and again for a war in Hungary in 1594. The banner was in Topkapı by 1595. After Mehmed III took the banner and won the Siege of Eger in 1596, the banner became a victory symbol for the Ottoman forces.

The banner was occasionally carried into battles to encourage troops and ensure victory. The banner would be taken out of its box by the sultan and affixed to a staff. He would carry it from the Chamber of the Holy Relics to the Throne Room while officials called out "Allahu Akbar!". After this, the banner was carried from the Throne Room to the Gate of Felicity and placed there. The grand vizier would receive the banner from the sultan in a ceremony in the Throne Room. While the grand vizier and the  stood in attendance, the sultan would kiss the Holy Banner and entrust it to his grand vizier with the words: "I entrust the Sacred Standard to you and you to God. May He be your helper!" After a battle, the banner would be returned the same way with the sultan carrying it back to the chamber and putting it into its box, while Qur'anic chants were read aloud and incense burned.

The banner was also taken out when mutinies by Janissaries erupted in 1651 and for the last time in 1826.

References

Literature 

 Fanny Davis. Palace of Topkapi in Istanbul. 1970. ASIN B000NP64Z2

External links 
 Bilkent University | Images of the Sacred Trusts
 Topkapı Palace | III. Courtyard
 The Sacred Trust – Pavilion Of The Sacred Relics book by Hilmi Aydin
 The Sacred Trust – Pavilion Of The Sacred Relics book by Hilmi Aydin (UK site)

Topkapı Palace
Relics